Blue Dancers (French - Danseuses bleues) is an 1897 pastel by Edgar Degas. It is held in the Pushkin Museum, in Moscow, which it entered in 1948 from the State Museum of Modern Western Art. It was in Durand-Ruel's collection and then until 1918 in Sergei Shchukin's collection in Moscow.

References

19th-century drawings
Collections of the Pushkin Museum
1897 works
Drawings of people
Pastel drawings by Edgar Degas
Dance in art